The Victorian Railways L class was a class of  passenger locomotives operated by the Victorian Railways between 1861 and 1906.

References

Specific

External links
 L class steam locomotive no. 26
 L class steam locomotive no. 18

2-4-0ST locomotives
L class 1861
Railway locomotives introduced in 1861
Broad gauge locomotives in Australia
Scrapped locomotives
George England and Company locomotives
Avonside locomotives